Rituvík is a village on the southeast side of the Faroese island of Eysturoy located in the municipality of Runavíkar.

History
Founded in 1873, its current church was built in 1955. The name Rituvík means Kittiwake Cove.

Population
The 2015 population was 271. Its postal code is FO 640 and it had a Post Office for the three years 1964–1967.

References

See also
 List of towns in the Faroe Islands

Populated places in the Faroe Islands